Vladimir Myasishchev may refer to:
 Vladimir Mikhailovich Myasishchev (1902–1978), aircraft designer
 Vladimir Nikolayevich Myasishchev (1893–1973), psychologist